This is a complete list of appearances by members of the professional playing squad of UE Lleida during the 1987–88 season.

1988
Lleida